UVX may refer to: 
 United Verde Extension, a copper mine in Arizona
 Utah Valley Express, a bus rapid transit route in Utah
 UVX Mining Co., an American mining company